Gurid-e Bala (also Romanized as Gūrīd-e Bālā; also known as Goorid, Gūrīd, and Kūrīd) is a village in Momenabad Rural District, in the Central District of Sarbisheh County, South Khorasan Province, Iran. At the 2006 census, its population was 84, in 30 families.

References 

Populated places in Sarbisheh County